Goreswar is a town in Baksa district (part of erstwhile Kamrup district till 2004), situated in north bank of river Brahmaputra, surrounded by Rangiya and Baihata

Transport
The town is located north of National Highway 31, and well connected to nearby towns and cities with regular buses and other modes of transportation. Goreswar railway station is the main railway station in the area.

See also
 Rangiya
 Uparhali
 Benjamin Daimary

References

Cities and towns in Baksa district